BNS Anirban  is a Type 021 missile boat of the Bangladesh Navy. She was commissioned in June 1992.

Design

The ship's armament consists of four C-704 anti-ship missiles and two AK-230 twin 30mm guns, mounted on the bow and stern. She is equipped with one Type 352 Square Tie radar for surface search.

Service
Anirban was commissioned into the Bangladesh Navy on 1 June 1992. In 2010, the ship was upgraded with modern C-704 replacing old SY-1 missiles as mid-life upgradation.

See also
Fast attack craft

References

Ships built in China
Type 021 missile boats of the Bangladesh Navy
1992 ships